The Chevy Chase Land Company is a real estate holding and development company based in suburban Washington, D.C.

Founded in 1890 by Francis G. Newlands to develop all-white residential suburbs, it continues to operate today as a privately held firm. Among the company's developments are the Village of Chevy Chase, the Town of Chevy Chase, and the D.C. neighborhood of Chevy Chase.

History

19th century 
Around 1886 or 1887, Newlands launched an all-but-unprecedented effort to create a major streetcar suburb of Washington, D.C. Using his inheritance from his deceased wife's father, and attracting other investment partners—particularly Nevada politicians known as the "California Syndicate"—Newlands directed the quiet purchase of land along a straight line from just north of Dupont Circle, which was at the time the northwestern edge of urban development, into an unincorporated area of Maryland's Montgomery County and up to today's Jones Bridge Road. Newlands initially intended this line to run to the established town of Rockville, Maryland, but found it easier and cheaper to buy Montgomery County land about a half-mile to the east.

Among the parcels was "Oak View" in present-day Cleveland Park, the 26.5-acre country estate of Grover Cleveland, who had recently completed his first term as U.S. president. Newlands paid $140,000 for the land in February 1890, just four years after Cleveland had purchased it for $21,500.

On June 6, 1890, when his group of straw purchasers had accumulated , Newlands incorporated the Chevy Chase Land Company to bring the parcels together for development. That year, the Washington Star newspaper called it the "most notable transaction that has ever been known in the history of suburban property." 

Meanwhile, Newlands and his partners had also begun to build a streetcar line to connect their remote landholdings to the city center. In 1888, he acquired majority control of the Rock Creek Railway, which had obtained a charter to build one of D.C.'s first electric streetcar lines but lacked the funds for construction. Newlands and his partners funded the grading and construction of the road and streetcar right-of-way that would become Connecticut Avenue north of Rock Creek; the thoroughfare north of the District line was built by their Chevy Chase Land Company. Streetcar operations began in 1890 on two blocks of Florida Avenue NW east of Connecticut. The company ultimately spent about $1.5 million($ today) to build a five-mile line from 18th and U Streets NW to Chevy Chase Lake in Maryland. A key link was the first bridge across the deep valley of Rock Creek at Calvert Street. Erected by the Edgemore Bridge Company in 1891 at a cost of $70,000 ($ today), it stretched 755 feet across six wrought-iron trusses on iron trestles that were 125 feet high. The company then conveyed the bridge to the municipal government of Washington, D.C., which took up half the cost of maintaining the structure. When the bridge began to fail in 1911, its deck—a 40-foot-wide roadway flanked by five-foot walkways—was narrowed. (The bridge would be replaced in 1933-35 by the current Duke Ellington Bridge.)

In shaping the Chevy Chase neighborhoods, the Land Company pioneered efforts to provide various services to the growing areas. The Society for Architectural Historians writes, "A major reason for the success of this pioneering suburban community was the fact that the Chevy Chase Land Company included civil, sanitary, and structural engineers as well as architects, landscape architects, and real estate agents to incorporate zoning, architectural design guidelines, landscaping, and infrastructure...The company also constructed water and sewer systems and an electrical power house." That "power house" held the hydroelectric generator that drove the Connecticut Avenue streetcars; the Land Company had also built the manmade lake—Chevy Chase Lake—that drove the generator, and later provided a venue for boating, swimming, and other activities.

These services did not include shops, stores, or commerce in general, which were banned from the area; company leaders instead provided "freight service" on the Connecticut Avenue streetcar line by which groceries and other household goods might be delivered.

An avowed white supremacist, Newlands took steps to keep African Americans out of the new neighborhoods. Though the Chevy Chase Land Company only began attaching racial covenants to its houses several decades later, it initially set its prices for houses at points that effectively limited sales to well-off whites: $5,000 and up on Connecticut Avenue and $3,000 and up on side streets.

In 1894, the company built the Chevy Chase Inn on Connecticut Avenue; the property became Chevy Chase Junior College until 1950, then the national youth center for the National 4-H Foundation through 2021; it is currently being redeveloped as senior living.

20th century 
In 1906, Newlands' Land Company helped block the creation of Belmont, a subdivision intended to be a neighborhood created by African American developers and populated by African American homebuyers. In 1927, the company would successfully petition to have the subdivision erased from the Montgomery County property books.

In 1913, the Land Company provided the land for Montgomery County's first public school. The parcel sat northeast of Rosemary Circle in what is today the Town of Chevy Chase. Residents raised $5,000 to buy and erect four portable frame buildings as temporary classrooms for first- through 10th-grade students. In 1917, the permanent building opened, a two-story Art Deco-inspired brick structure then called the Chevy Chase School; it would eventually become Chevy Chase Elementary School.

Newlands ran the company until his death in 1917. One year previously, a sales brochure alluded to steps taken to keep Chevy Chase white: "The only restrictions imposed are those which experience has proven are necessary in any residential section to maintain or increase values and protect property holders against the encroachment of undesirable elements."

Newlands was succeeded by Edward J. Stellwagen. In 1925, the company built the Chevy Chase Arcade in northwest D.C.; it was planned as "one of four business centers alternating with apartments along Connecticut Avenue."

In 1932, Edward Hillyer became company president. Under Hillyer, the Chevy Chase Land Company inserted covenants into land purchases barring their sale to Black or Jewish people. The racial "restrictions waned during World War II and were barred entirely by the Supreme Court in 1948, but the legacy of discrimination lingers," a historian wrote in 2016; Chevy Chase Village, for example, was 95.9% White at the 2015 census.

Under Stellwagen and Hillyer, the company mostly just sold off pieces of land. That would change after World War II, when it began to more actively develop buildings. 

In 1946, William S. Farr became company president. Born in 1903, Farr was both a grand-nephew and grandson-in-law of Newlands. 

Farr was followed in 1972 by Hunter Davidson. In 1979, the company announced a deal with the Washington Metropolitan Area Transit Authority to build a 12-story office building above the planned Friendship Heights station on the Washington Metro's Red Line. The office and station were planned for the pie-slice-shaped plot immediately north of the intersection of Wisconsin Avenue and Western Avenue. The company owned the plot, upon which had previously stood a Howard Johnson's motel; the deal allowed Metro to build its station as planned without the expense of purchasing the plot from the company.

In 1981, Davidson handed the reins to Farr's son, Gavin M. Farr (b. 1942). 

In 1988, the Land Company sold a 22.5-acre tract at Connecticut Avenue and Jones Bridge Road to the Howard Hughes Medical Institute. As part of the sales agreement, the company "retained the rights for architectural approvals in order to be sure that Chevy Chase's architectural integrity is maintained," a company official said.

21st century 
In 2008, David Smith, a great-great-grandson of Newlands, became the company's president and CEO. He was abruptly ousted in August 2014; company officials declined to say why. At the time, the company owned some 1.5 million square feet of commercial real estate, mostly office space and retail properties in or around Bethesda and Chevy Chase.

Smith was replaced as interim CEO by board leader Kate Carr, and then by Tom Regnell, who had been an executive at Washington Real Estate Investment Trust. In July 2020, Regnell was replaced as president and CEO by John L. Ziegenhein III.

Among the company's holdings are the Lake West Shopping Center in Chevy Chase, The Collection at Chevy Chase near Friendship Heights, and South Lakes Village in Reston, Virginia. Its apartment buildings and complexes include 672 Flats in Ballston, Virginia, which it acquired for $90 million in 2018; and Chase Manor Apartments in Chevy Chase. Its office buildings include 8401 Connecticut Avenue in Chevy Chase, with 169,812 square feet.

External links

 
 400-plus items held by the Chevy Chase Historical Society having to do with the Land Company
 Letter, December 4, 2014, Chevy Chase Historical Society; includes "A Selected Bibliography of Historical Research on the Early Development of Chevy Chase and the role of Francis G. Newlands"

References

Chevy Chase Land Company
Real estate and property developers
Real estate companies established in 1890